Coolongolook River, a watercourse of the Mid-Coast Council system, is located in the Mid North Coast district of New South Wales, Australia.

Course and features
Coolongolook River rises on the northern slopes below Mount Chapman within the Koolonock Range, near Wootton, and flows generally north and north northeast, joined by the Wallamba and Wallingat rivers, before reaching its confluence with Wallis Lake; descending  over its  course.

See also 

 Rivers of New South Wales
 List of rivers of New South Wales (A–K)
 List of rivers of Australia

References

External links
 

Rivers of New South Wales
Mid-Coast Council
Mid North Coast